Manufactured by Ro-Pat-In Corporation, Rickenbacker, the Electro-Spanish Ken Roberts is considered the pioneering "grandfather" to the modern electric guitar as it was the first commercially produced, full-scale (twenty-five inch) electric guitar ever produced. It was the first artist signature model having been named after Ken Roberts, a friend of (Ro-Pat-In President) George Beauchamp. In addition, the instrument was the first electric guitar to provide a stock appointed tremolo arm; designed & patented by Doc Kauffman. The Electro-Spanish Ken Roberts holds the current world record for the highest price paid for a guitar, after selling in 2017 for $7.5 million.

History

Produced between 1931–1938, the instrument line was officially released in 1935 and was terminated in 1938. It is estimated that less than 50 total quantity were produced & sold between 1935–1938. Less than 10 are known to survive . It was the first electric guitar to offer players an extended neck that joined the body at the 17th fret, enabling extended playability on the 22 fret neck; a design element that persists in the current day electric guitar. Another key element found on the Electro-Spanish Ken Roberts, was the stock equipped hand-operated “Vib-rola” vibrato device produced by patent holder Clayton Doc Kauffman.

Historical significance
The Rickenbacker Electro-Spanish Ken Roberts was revolutionary for its time. Its design elements set precedence for future electric guitars development in particular Fender and Les Paul who would later utilize the Doc Kauffman vibrola on his early "log" prototypes and personal signature models. The Electro-Spanish Ken Roberts was designed to play standing up vertical with a strap, as practiced in modern electric guitar performance. Concurrently with Rickenbacker's Spanish guitars, Hawaiian "lap-steel" instruments were also produced.

Historian perspectives

Dan Orkin, Director of Content with Reverb.com stated in 2017: "What makes this guitar special is that it is what most people consider the first modern electric guitar. There's a lot of debate about which was truly the first one of course. This was the popular guitar music of the time. Electric guitars like this, the Spanish style, really took off with jazz and a lot of the big band music of the time. You had the Vib-Rola system, designed by Doc Kauffman, who went on to collaborate with Leo Fender, and a body produced by Harmony, which was another big instrument manufacturer of the time. So this guitar was a really unique piece of guitar history. Only around 50 of these guitars were produced, and six or seven are known to exist today."

In 2014, a popular vintage instrument boutique in New York City's Brooklyn neighborhood, RetroFret Vintage Rare & Unusual Fretted Instruments, composed a historical evaluation on a surviving Electro-Spanish Ken Roberts guitar. RetroFret stated: "Rickenbacker were the undisputed pioneers in the commercialization of the electric guitar, and the early Ken Roberts electric Spanish model is one of the most important, if relatively unknown, of their early creations. Although mostly forgotten by history, the Ken Roberts represents a fascinating and important step in the evolution of the modern electric guitar."
 
Historian and author Rich Maloof stated in his 2017 article titled "Who Really Invented the Electric Guitar" featured on Reverb.com: "With less than 50 built, the Ken Roberts guitar was, in many ways, the first modern electric Spanish–style guitar ever produced."

References

Electric guitars
Rickenbacker guitars
Semi-acoustic guitars